Saliw Babawo (born 3 March 1999) is a Ghanaian professional footballer who plays as a midfielder.

References

External links 
 Profile at Dinamo Brest website

1999 births
Living people
Ghanaian footballers
Ghanaian expatriate footballers
Expatriate footballers in Belarus
Expatriate footballers in Finland
Association football midfielders
Sekondi Hasaacas F.C. players
FC Dynamo Brest players
Pargas Idrottsförening players